The Minaret-ul-Masih (lit. Minaret of the Messiah) is a stone tower and monument standing beside the Aqsa Mosque in Qadian, India. It was constructed under the direction of Mirza Ghulam Ahmad, the founder of the Ahmadiyya movement specifically as a lighthouse symbolising the ultimate pre-eminence of Islam.

Its construction was completed in 1916 and has since become a symbol and distinctive mark in Ahmadiyya Islam. The minaret features on the Ahmadiyya flag and also (sometimes with rays of light) in the movement's major publications. It is classified as a historical monument.

Religious significance 
According to a prophecy in Islamic tradition, Jesus, upon his advent in  the end times, would descend near a white minaret to the east of Damascus.

The Minaret
According to Ghulam Ahmad, this prophecy was fulfilled with his advent in Qadian, a town situated directly to the east of Damascus, and the significance of the minaret was symbolic. Reference to a white minaret, according to him, symbolised the spread of Islamic teachings linked to the coming of the Messiah, which would enlighten the world and lead to Islam's ultimate pre-eminence. Ghulam Ahmad wrote:

East of Damascus
With reference to the Messiah appearing to the east of Damascus – a commercial city within the Christian Byzantine Empire during Muhammad's time – In a tract published on 28 May 1900, Ghulam Ahmad linked Biblical prophecies concerning the return of Christ with those found in the Quran and Hadith, stating that they pointed in the same direction for a specific reason, particularly the one mentioned by Jesus in the 24th chapter of the Gospel of Matthew:

According to Ghulam Ahmad, specific mention in the hadith of the east of Damascus with reference to the promised Messiah, carried a deeply religious significance since it was in Damascus that Paul of Tarsus laid the foundation of the doctrine of Trinity and divinity of Jesus and therefore the seed for the corruption of Christian beliefs, according to him, was first sown in Damascus. From there this erroneous idea had spread to other countries with Paul’s preaching, particularly towards the West. It was therefore fitting that the Messiah appear from the East and, like the sun, illumine through his teachings even the West where the Christian faith would at the time be ascendant. In the same tract, he wrote:

History and purpose
Although Ghulam Ahmad interpreted the prophecy symbolically, with the publication of the announcement in 1900, he sought to construct a physical structure representing the fulfilment of the prophecy and solicited donations for the building of the minaret laying its foundation on 13 March 1903. The minaret, according to him, was to be a physical representation of the fulfilment of the prophecy and a monument signifying the advent of the Promised Messiah with a light and a clock fixed on its top symbolising the light of Islamic teachings spreading far and wide and "so that Man will recognize his time", and a Muezzin to give the call to prayer five times a day symbolising an invitation to Islam. Though the foundation stone for the minaret was laid in 1903, construction subsequently stopped due to a lack of funds. Work continued under Mirza Bashir-ud-Din Mahmud the second  Khalifa in 1914, reaching completion in 1916. Bright lights were fixed at the top of the minaret. These lights were not fixed so as to brighten the minaret itself but were instead pointing away from the minaret thereby representing its Lighthouse status. The clock was not fixed until 1933 and in the late 1930s it was coated with plaster of white marble. In 1980, it was veneered with white marble slabs.

References 

Ahmadiyya buildings and structures
Buildings and structures in Punjab, India
Minarets in India